Route 147 is a  east–west state highway in Massachusetts, serving the cities of Agawam and West Springfield. Its western terminus is at Mill Street and Springfield Street in Agawam, and its eastern terminus is at U.S. Route 5 (US 5) in West Springfield. It follows the easternmost few miles of the former route of Route 57 before it was moved onto a limited access freeway a mile south, the Henry E. Bodurtha Highway, completed in 1966.

Route description

Route 147 begins at the intersection of Springfield Street and Mill Street in Agawam, where Springfield Street bears northeast and Mill Street begins east. The route continues northeast for two miles (3 km) then turns east at the intersection with North Street. Route 147 follows Springfield Street to an intersection with Route 75/Suffield Street and Route 159/Main Street. Route 75 and Route 159 both are continuations of Connecticut routes having the same number that enter Massachusetts four miles (6 km) to the south. At the intersection, Route 147 takes a left turn onto the Anne Sullivan bridge over the Westfield River and enters West Springfield.

Route 147 in West Springfield follows Memorial Avenue east-northeast past the Eastern States Exposition grounds, where the agricultural state fair for the six New England states meets each year. The route continues down Memorial Avenue past the large former Boston and Albany, now CSX, rail freight yard. Route 147 then continues past the Century Center shopping center before ending at US 5/Riverdale Street at a rotary adjacent to the Memorial Bridge over the Connecticut River into Springfield.

Major intersections

References

External links

147